is a district of Machida, Tokyo, Japan. The current administrative place name is Haramachida 1-chome to 6-chome (residential addressing system).

References

Districts of Machida, Tokyo